Arco are a British band noted for unusually slow, quiet, poetic music: a gig review in national newspaper The Guardian suggested "an hour in arco's company is the aural equivalent of a day in a flotation tank". Similarly, a review in Q, a UK monthly music magazine, described first album Coming To Terms  as "the aural equivalent of a human being pausing for thought as the world speeds on around".

Their track "Lullaby" was featured on the soundtrack album of Californication on the US Showtime network.

In Korea two tracks, "Alien" and "Perfect World", were featured on the soundtrack album of network drama series Coffee Prince, while "Lullaby" featured in an advertisement for Sky mobile phones, and "Babies Eyes" in an advert for "17" tea. "Alien" also appeared in the soundtrack of the film Turning Green, and in the soundtrack of One Tree Hill (series 1, episode 15).

In 2005 they played a tour of the US west coast, including gigs at Los Angeles, Santa Cruz, San Francisco, Portland and Seattle.

Their most recent, and apparently final album, Yield, was released via Pastel in Korea in 2010.

Members
Chris Healey - vocals, guitars, keyboards
Dave Milligan - bass, guitars
Nick Healey - drums

Discography

EPs
Longsighted (1998)
Ending Up (1998)
Driving at Night (2000)
Alien (2001)

Albums
Coming to Terms (2000)
Transparency (compilation album, 2002)
Restraint (2004)
Yield (2010)

References

External links
Official website
MySpace page

British rock music groups